is a retired Japanese male long-distance runner. He competed for Japan at the 1992 Summer Olympics in Barcelona, Spain where he won the silver medal in the men's marathon event.

Beyond his Olympic medal, his achievements include wins at the Beppu-Ōita Marathon and the Tokyo International Marathon. His winning time in the former race (2:08:53) was the fastest marathon recorded in 1991.

Since 1999, he has managed the Toyota Kyūshū Athletic team, based in Miyawaka, Fukuoka. He has coached many runners including the late Samuel Wanjiru, who was a member of the team from 2005 to early 2008.

Achievements

External links 
 
 
 

1967 births
Living people
Japanese male long-distance runners
Japanese male marathon runners
Olympic silver medalists for Japan
Athletes (track and field) at the 1992 Summer Olympics
Olympic athletes of Japan
Asian Games medalists in athletics (track and field)
Athletes (track and field) at the 1990 Asian Games
Olympic silver medalists in athletics (track and field)
Asian Games gold medalists for Japan
Medalists at the 1990 Asian Games
Medalists at the 1992 Summer Olympics
20th-century Japanese people